Korobeynikovo is a rural locality (a selo) in Zerkalsky Selsoviet, Shipunovsky District, Altai Krai, Russia. The population was 267 as of 2013. It was founded in 1785. There are 9 streets.

Geography 
Korobeynikovo is located 58 km northwest of Shipunovo (the district's administrative centre) by road. Andreyevka is the nearest rural locality.

References 

Rural localities in Shipunovsky District